Ayothi is a 2023 Indian Tamil-language action drama film directed by newcomer R. Manthira Moorthy, starring M. Sasikumar, Preethi Asrani, Yashpal Sharma, and Pugazh  in the lead roles. The music was composed by N. R. Raghunanthan with cinematography by Madhesh Manickam and editing by San Lokesh. The film released on 3 March 2023 and opened to positive reviews.

Cast 
 Sasikumar as Abdul Malik
 Preethi Asrani as Shivani
 Yashpal Sharma as Balram
 Pugazh as Pandi
 Chetan
 Pondy Ravi
 Bose Venkat
 Kalloori Vinoth
 Anju Asrani as Janaki
 Master Advaith Vinod as Sonu

Production 
Manthira Moorthy made his directorial debut with the film The film's title was announced on 22nd November 2021, and the shooting started on the same date.

Music 
The music of the film is composed by N.R. Raghunanthan

Reception 
The film was released on 3 March 2023 across Tamil Nadu. Logesh Ramachandran of The Times of India who gave 3.5 stars out of 5 stars after reviewing the film stated that,"Ayothi is a movie that constantly emphasises love over religion, and it's worth watching". A critic from Maalai Malar mentioned "He has skillfully worked among the characters. Although there are logical violations in the film, they do not seem to be major." Chandhini R of Cinema Express rated the film 3.5 out of 5 stars and wrote "This Sasikumar-starrer is full of heart and yet, marred by melodrama"

References

External links 

Indian drama films
2020s Tamil-language films
2023 drama films